Millions in the Air is a 1935 American comedy film directed by Ray McCarey and written by Sig Herzig and Jane Storm. The film stars John Howard, Wendy Barrie, Willie Howard, George Barbier, Benny Baker, Eleanore Whitney and Robert Cummings. The film was released on December 12, 1935, by Paramount Pictures.

Plot

Amateur performers on Colonel Edwards' popular radio show get a gong rung by the show's sponsor, soap mogul Calvin Keller, if they aren't any good. It doesn't surprise the audience when would-be opera singer Tony Pagano is judged a disappointment, but the act of Eddie Warren and Marion Keller wowed the crowd. Everyone is stunned when they, too, get the gong.

Marion's fiancé Gordon Rogers dislikes her being a vaudeville entertainer. Eddie, an ice cream vendor, wants to succeed with or without her, but he's jealous when he learns of Marion's relationship with Gordon and parts ways with her. He is also irked when his pal Jimmy wins the radio contest along with his old dance partner, Bubbles.

During the next show, Keller gets so many complaints from listeners and audience members that he insists Colonel Edwards reunite the team of Eddie and Marion that very night. It takes some doing, but ultimately the twosome steals the show.

Cast 

John Howard as Eddie Warren
Wendy Barrie as Marion Keller
Willie Howard as Tony Pagano
George Barbier as Calvin Keller
Benny Baker as Benny
Eleanore Whitney as Bubbles
Robert Cummings as Jimmy
Catherine Doucet as Mrs. Waldo-Walker
Samuel S. Hinds as Colonel Edwards
Halliwell Hobbes as Theodore
Dave Chasen as Dave
Stephen Chase as Gordon Rogers III
Benny Bartlet as Kid Pianist
Billy Gilbert as Nikolas Popadopolis
Ralph Malone as Jason
Frances Robinson as Sally
Irving Bacon as Mr. Perkins
Inez Courtney as Miss Waterbury
Harry C. Bradley as Mr. Waldo-Walker
Russell Hicks as Davis
Harry Tenbrook as Mike
Paul Fix as Hank
Marion Hargrove as Blonde
Joan Davis as Singer
Adrienne Marden as Girl
Paul Newlan as Charles Haines

Production
Cummings was cast in August 1935.

References

External links 
 

1935 films
Paramount Pictures films
American comedy films
1935 comedy films
Films directed by Ray McCarey
American black-and-white films
1930s English-language films
1930s American films